Trichura latifascia is a moth in the subfamily Arctiinae. It was described by Francis Walker in 1854. It is found in Panama, Colombia, French Guiana and Pará, Brazil.

Subspecies
Trichura latifascia latifascia (Brazil: Para)
Trichura latifascia ismene Möschler, 1878 (Panama, Colombia, French Guiana)

References

Moths described in 1854
Arctiini